The Tower of Jericho is an  stone structure built in the Pre-Pottery Neolithic A period around 8000 BCE. It is considered the world’s first stone building, and possibly the world's first work of monumental architecture.

The ancient wall of Jericho had been discovered by John Garstang during the excavations of 1930 to 1936, which he suggested were those described in the Book of Joshua in the Bible and dated to around 1400 BCE. Kathleen Kenyon discovered the tower built against the wall inside the town during excavations between 1952 and 1958. Kenyon provided evidence that both constructions dated to much earlier, to the Neolithic, which is the latest part of the Stone Age, and were part of an early proto-city. The tower highlights the importance of Jericho for the understanding of settlement patterns in the Sultanian period in the Southern Levant.

Structure

The tower was constructed using undressed stones, with an internal staircase of twenty-two steps. The construction of the tower is estimated to have taken 11,000 working days.

Purpose

Studies by Ran Barkai and Roy Liran from Tel Aviv University published in 2011 have suggested astronomical and social purposes in the construction of the tower. Showing an early example of archaeoastronomy, they used computer modelling to determine that the shadow of nearby mountains first hit the tower on the sunset of the summer solstice and then spread across the entire town. Noting that there were no known invasions of the area at the time of construction, the defensive purpose of the tower, wall and ditch at Jericho has been brought into question. No burials were found and suggestions of it being a tomb have been dismissed.

Discussing in The Jerusalem Post, Barkai argued that the structure was used to create awe and inspiration to convince people into a harder way of life with the development of agriculture and social hierarchies. He concluded: "We believe this tower was one of the mechanisms to motivate people to take part in a communal lifestyle."

See also

List of megalithic sites

References

External links
 MSNBC - Jericho mystery solved: It was a tower of power
 BiblePlaces.com - Neolithic Tower

Buildings and structures completed in the 8th millennium BC
1950s archaeological discoveries
Ancient Jericho
Buildings and structures in Jericho
Archaeological sites in the West Bank
Megalithic monuments
Stone Age Asia
Sacred rocks
Neolithic sites of Asia
Former world's tallest buildings
Pre-Pottery Neolithic A